New Sweden is a small unincorporated community in northeast Travis County, Texas.
New Sweden is on Farm Road 973, five miles northeast of Manor, Texas. It is the site of New Sweden Lutheran Church,  a member of the Evangelical Lutheran Church in America.

The community was established in 1873 and was known then as Knight's Ranch. The first pioneers of this settlement, with a few exceptions, came from the historic Swedish province of Småland. The Swedish Evangelical Lutheran Congregation was established on February 23, 1876, and carried the name Manor until 1887 when it was renamed New Sweden.  With the establishment of the New Sweden Lutheran Church, the community itself became known as New Sweden. A cotton gin began operation at New Sweden in 1882, and a post office opened in 1887.

In 2009 the estimated population was 60.

Popular Culture
Scenes for the HBO Max true crime series Love and Death were shot at the New Sweden Lutheran Church on March 9, 2022.

References

External links
New Sweden Evangelical Lutheran Church
New Sweden Cemetery

Unincorporated communities in Texas
Unincorporated communities in Travis County, Texas
Swedish-American culture in Texas
Swedish-American history